Virus is the tenth studio album by Swedish melodic death metal band Hypocrisy. It was released on 19 September 2005 by Nuclear Blast. It is the first Hypocrisy album recorded with their new drummer Horgh from the black metal band Immortal and second guitarist Andreas Holma. The album features a music video for the song "Scrutinized".

Early pressings of the CD were sold with a 13-song limited edition live DVD, with 12 songs recorded in Strasbourg on Hypocrisy's 2004 tour as support of Cannibal Corpse, and from a different show they play the song "Total Disaster" by Destruction along with the band's vocalist and bass guitar player Marcel "Schmier" Schirmer. Some CDs have a bonus track, "Watch Out", which appears to be a demo of a song recorded in 2000.

Some early pressings have an error where a scratch sound can be heard on tracks 6 and 11. The Nuclear Blast record label said it would mail a replacement to anyone who had one of these glitched discs.

Track listing 

Limited edition DVD bonus tracks:
Tracks 1–12 were recorded in Strasbourg on 4 August 2004. Track 13 was recorded at the Bang Your Head!!! festival in 2003.

Credits

Band members 
Peter Tägtgren − vocals, guitar, keyboards
Andreas Holma − guitar
Mikael Hedlund − bass
Horgh (Reidar Horghagen) − drums

Production 
Recorded at The Abyss November–December 2004
Produced and mixed by Peter Tägtgren
Engineered by Hypocrisy
Mastered in Cuttingroom by Björn Engelmann

Songwriting and composition 
Solo on "Scrutinized" performed by Gary Holt

Charts

References

External links 

Hypocrisy (band) albums
2005 albums
Nuclear Blast albums
Albums produced by Peter Tägtgren